Henry Kulp Ober is a former President of Elizabethtown College.

Ober served as president from 1918 until 1921, when he left to study at Franklin and Marshall College.  He returned as president in 1924 and served until January 1928.

Ober Residence hall on the Elizabethtown College campus is named in his honor.

References

Presidents of Elizabethtown College
Franklin & Marshall College alumni